"Don't Let Me Be Yours" is a song by the Swedish singer Zara Larsson. It was released on 12 May 2017, as the seventh single from Larsson's second studio album, So Good (2017). The song was co-written by Ed Sheeran, who additionally provided backing vocals.

Composition 
"Don't Let Me Be Yours" is a pop song with the length of three minutes and nineteen seconds. It is in the key of E major and moves at a tempo of 113 beats per minute in a 4/4 time signature.

Critical reception 
Mike Wass of Idolator wrote that the song "meets the soulful-pop-with-euro-beats brief better than most, showing what the Swedish pop star is capable of when given the right material."

Music video
The music video for the song, directed by Daniel Kaufman, was premiered on 12 May 2017 on Larsson's Vevo channel. The video has a girl power theme, following the story of a young girl who aspires to be a racer.

Track listing

Personnel 
 Zara Larsson – vocals, writer, background vocals
 Johnny McDaid – writer
 Ed Sheeran – writer, background vocals, guitar
 Steve Mac – writer, producer, keyboard, piano
 Chris Laws – drums
 Phil Tan – mixing engineer
 Bill Zimmerman – mixing engineer
 Chris Laws – mixing engineer
 Dann Pursey – mixing engineer
 Michelle Mancini – mastering engineer

Charts

Release history

References

2017 singles
2017 songs
Zara Larsson songs
Epic Records singles
Sony Music singles
Songs written by Steve Mac
Songs written by Ed Sheeran
Songs written by Johnny McDaid
Songs written by Zara Larsson
Song recordings produced by Steve Mac